The School of Biological Sciences is one of the academic units of the University of California, Irvine (UCI). The school is divided into four departments: developmental and cell biology, ecology and evolutionary biology, molecular biology and biochemistry, and neurobiology and behavior. With over 3,700 students it is in the top four largest schools in the university.<ref></http://grad-schools.usnews.rankingsandreviews.com/best-graduate-schools/top-medical-schools/research-rankings/page+2> In 2013, the Francisco J. Ayala School of Biological Sciences contained 19.4 percent of the student population

</ref>
It is consistently ranked in the top one hundred in U.S. News & World Report’s yearly list of best graduate schools.

History
The School of Biological Sciences first opened in 1965 at the University of California, Irvine and was one of the first schools founded when the University campus opened. The school's founding Dean, Edward A. Steinhaus, had four founding department chairs and started out with 17 professors.

On March 12, 2014, the School was officially renamed after UCI professor and donor Francisco J. Ayala by then-Chancellor Michael V. Drake. Ayala had previously pledged to donate $10 million to the School of Biological Sciences in 2011. The school reverted to its previous name in June 2018, after a university investigation confirmed that Ayala had sexually harassed at least four women colleagues and graduate students.

Notes

External links

 

University of California, Irvine
Biology education
Science education in the United States
Science and technology in Greater Los Angeles
University subdivisions in California
Educational institutions established in 1965
1965 establishments in California